The Topanga Canyon Formation is a Miocene epoch geologic formation in the Santa Monica Mountains, Simi Hills, Santa Ana Mountains and San Joaquin Hills, in Los Angeles County, Ventura County, and Orange County, southern California. It is primarily composed of hard sandstone with some inter-bedded siltstone.

Fossils

It preserves fossils dating back to the Miocene epoch of the Neogene period, during the Cenozoic Era.

See also

 
 List of fossiliferous stratigraphic units in California
 Paleontology in California

References

Miocene California
Geology of Los Angeles County, California
Geology of Ventura County, California
Miocene geology
Santa Monica Mountains
Simi Hills
Topanga, California
Geologic formations of California